Andy Last (born 25 March 1981) is an English professional rugby league coach who is the current interim coach for the Castleford Tigers in the Betfred Super League, and the assistant coach of England at international level.

On 6 March 2023, he was appointed temporary head coach of Castleford, as previous head coach Lee Radford, was sacked.

References

External links

Castleford Tigers profile

1981 births
Living people
Castleford Tigers coaches
English rugby league players
Rugby league hookers
Hull F.C. coaches
Hull F.C. players
Rugby league players from Kingston upon Hull